Naveen Shahdara is an affluent residential area for the upper middle and business class, located in the North East Delhi district of Delhi, India. The area is known for its rising property prices thus making it one of the upmarket areas of Shahdara.

References

Neighbourhoods in Delhi
Cities and towns in North East Delhi district